"Keep Singing" is a song by English singer and songwriter Rick Astley. It was released as a digital download in the United Kingdom on 6 April 2016 as the lead single from his seventh studio album 50 (2016). The song peaked at number 127 on the UK Singles Chart and also charted in Belgium. The song was written and produced by Astley and is performed in the key of B flat minor.

In 2019, Astley recorded and released a 'Reimagined' version of the song for his album The Best of Me.

Music video
A music video to accompany the release of "Keep Singing" was first released onto YouTube on 6 April 2016 at a total length of three minutes and thirty-eight seconds.

Track listing

Chart performance

Weekly charts

Release history

References

2016 songs
2016 singles
Rick Astley songs